Auclaye is a  geological Site of Special Scientific Interest south of Capel in Surrey. It is a Geological Conservation Review site.

This site is important for its Mesozoic insects, with many well preserved bodies from several orders dating to the Lower Cretaceous period. It has produced new species of aculeate hymenoptera and cricket.

The site is private land with no public access.

References

Sites of Special Scientific Interest in Surrey
Geological Conservation Review sites
Geology of South-East England